Victoria Island is a large island in the Arctic Archipelago that straddles the boundary between Nunavut and the Northwest Territories of Canada. It is nearly double the size of Newfoundland, and is slightly larger than the island of Great Britain but smaller than Honshu. The western third of the island lies in the Inuvik Region of the Northwest Territories; the remainder is part of Nunavut's Kitikmeot Region. The population of 2,168 is divided among 2 settlements, the larger of which is in Nunavut and the other of which is in the Northwest Territories.

The island is named after Queen Victoria, the Canadian sovereign from 1867 to 1901 (though she first became Queen in 1837). The features bearing the name "Prince Albert" are named after her consort, Albert.

History

Victoria Island was inhabited by the Thule culture, with five prehistoric qamutiik (sleds) belonging to the Neoeskimo culture being found on the Wollaston Peninsula, dating to 1250–1573 CE. The Inuinnaqtun name for the island is Kitlineq, with the local Inuit people called Kitlinermiut (Copper Inuit).

In 1826 John Richardson was the first European to see the southwest coast and called it "Wollaston Land". In 1839, Peter Warren Dease and Thomas Simpson followed its southeast coast and called it "Victoria Land". A map published by John Barrow in 1846 shows a complete blank from these two lands north to "Banks Land" which is the north coast of Banks Island. In 1851 John Rae charted its entire south coast and connected the two "lands". In 1850 and 1851 Robert McClure circumnavigated most of Banks Island, thereby separating it from the rest of Victoria Land. His men also charted the northwest and west coasts of Victoria Island.
One of Roald Amundsen's men, Godfred Hansen, charted its east coast as far as Cape Nansen in 1905, and in 1916 and 1917 Storker T. Storkerson, of Vilhjalmur Stefansson's Canadian Arctic Expedition, charted its northeast coast, sighting the Storkerson Peninsula.

In 2008 Clark Carter and Chris Bray became the first recorded people to walk across Victoria Island. Their first attempt at the  trek in 2005 failed, so they returned and completed the remaining  in 2008.

Geography

Viscount Melville Sound lies to the north, and the M'Clintock Channel and Victoria Strait lie eastward. On the west are Amundsen Gulf and Banks Island, which is separated from Victoria by a long sound called the Prince of Wales Strait. To the south (from west to east) lie the Dolphin and Union Strait, Austin Bay, Coronation Gulf and the Dease Strait.

The southern waterways, and sometimes the Prince of Wales Strait, form part of the disputed Northwest Passage which the Government of Canada claims are Canadian Internal Waters, while other nations state they are either territorial waters or international waters.

Victoria Island is an island of peninsulas, having a heavily indented coastline with many inlets. In the east, pointing northwards, is the Storkerson Peninsula, which ends with the Goldsmith Channel, the body of water separating Victoria from Stefansson Island. The Storkerson Peninsula is separated from the island's north-central areas by Hadley Bay, a major inlet. Another, broad peninsula is found in the north, Prince Albert Peninsula. This ends at the Prince of Wales Strait. In the south, and pointing westwards, is the Wollaston Peninsula, separated from the island's central areas by Prince Albert Sound.

Located in the southeast, just north of Cambridge Bay, is Tahiryuaq (formerly Ferguson Lake).

It was said by Andrew Hund in his book, Antarctica and the Arctic Circle: A Geographic Encyclopedia of the Earth's Polar Regions, that the island resembles a stylized maple leaf, the predominant symbol of Canada.

Climate
Summers are typically cool and rainy, with pleasant days and chilly nights. Winters are cold, dark, and long, with October being the snowiest month. Snowfall and frosts are possible all year round. Rainfall is usually limited to the summer months, when the temperature shortly rises above freezing for a few months before dipping back down for another 9 months of winter. Springs are typically sunny but still very chilly. Autumns are short and crisp, with more frequent cloud cover starting to appear during August and with September being almost constantly cloudy.

At Cambridge Bay, the sun is continuously below the horizon, polar night, from approximately 30 November to 11 January and above the horizon, midnight sun, 19 May to 22 July.

Biology
The Dolphin-Union caribou herd locally known as Island Caribou are a migratory population of barren-ground caribou, Rangifer tarandus groenlandicus, that occupy Victoria Island in Canada's High Arctic and the nearby mainland. They are endemic to Canada. They migrate across the Dolphin and Union Strait from their summer grazing on Victoria Island to their winter grazing area on the Nunavut-NWT mainland. It is unusual for North American caribou to seasonally cross sea ice and the only other caribou to do so are the Peary caribou, which are smaller in size and population, and also occur on Victoria Island.

Victoria Island contains the world's largest island within an island within an island.

Demographics
In the 2021 Canadian census the population of the island was 2,168; 1,760 in Nunavut and 408 in the Northwest Territories. Of the two settlements on the island the larger is Cambridge Bay, which lies on the south-east coast and is in Nunavut. Ulukhaktok is on the west coast and is in the Northwest Territories. Trading posts, such as Fort Collinson on the northwest coast, have long been abandoned.

List of places by population

Notes

Maps

Viscount Melville Sound - 
M'Clintock Channel - 
Victoria Strait - 
Amundsen Gulf - 
Banks Island - 
Prince of Wales Strait - 
Dolphin and Union Strait - 
Austin Bay - 
Coronation Gulf - 
Dease Strait - 
Storkerson Peninsula - 
Goldsmith Channel - 
Stefansson Island - 
Hadley Bay - 
Prince Albert Peninsula - 
Wollaston Peninsula - 
Shaler Mountains - 
Tahiryuaq - 
Cambridge Bay - 
Ulukhaktok - 
Fort Collinson -

See also
Parker's Notch
Tunnunik impact crater

References

Further reading

 Geological Survey of Canada, J. G. Fyles, D. A. Hodgson, and J. Bednarski. Quaternary Geology of Wynniatt Bay, Victoria Island, Northwest Territories. Open file (Geological Survey of Canada), 2718. 1988.
 Geological Survey of Canada, R. H. Rainbird, A. N. LeCheminant, and I. Lawyer. Geology, Duke of York Inlier, Victoria Island, Northwest Territories. Open file (Geological Survey of Canada), 3304. 1997.
 Geological Survey of Canada, D. A. Hodgson, and J. Bednarski. Preliminary Suficial Materials of Kagloryuak River (77F) and Burns Lake (77G), Victoria Island, Northwest Territories. Open file (Geological Survey of Canada), 2883. 1994.
 Gyselman, E. C., and L. K. Gould. Data on Amphidromous and Freshwater Fish from Central Victoria Island and Freshwater Systems Draining into Melville Sound and Elu Inlet, N.W.T., Canada. Winnipeg: Dept. of Fisheries and Oceans, 1992.
 Jakimchuk, R. D., and D. R. Carruthers. Caribou and Muskoxen on Victoria Island, N.W.T. Sidney, B.C.: R.D. Jakimchuk Management Associates Ltd, 1980.
 McGhee, Robert. An Archaeological Survey of Western Victoria Island, N.W.T., Canada. Ottawa, Ont: National Museums of Canada, 1971.
 Parmelee, David Freeland, H. A. Stephens, and Richard H. Schmidt. The Birds of Southeastern Victoria Island and Adjacent Small Islands. Ottawa: [Queen's Printer], 1967.
 Peterson, E. B., R. D. Kabzems, and V. M. Levson. Terrain and Vegetation Along the Victoria Island Portion of a Polar Gas Combined Pipeline System. Sidney, B.C.: Western Ecological Services, 1981.
 Rainbird, Robert H. Stratigraphy, Sedimentology and Tectonic Setting of the Upper Shaler Group, Victoria Island, Northwest Territories. Ottawa: National Library of Canada = Bibliothèque nationale du Canada, 1991. 
 Washburn, A. L. Reconnaissance Geology of Portions of Victoria Island and Adjacent Regions, Arctic Canada. [New York]: Geological Society of America, 1947.

External links

 
Inhabited islands of Kitikmeot Region
Islands of the Northwest Territories
Borders of Nunavut
Borders of the Northwest Territories
Geography of the Inuvialuit Settlement Region